The Punnainallur Kailasanathar Temple, is a Hindu temple dedicated to Shiva located at Punnainallur near Thanjavur in the state of Tamil Nadu, India.

Palace Devasthanam
Thanjavur Palace Devasthanam comprises 88 temples, of which this temple is the one. They are maintained and administered by the Hindu Religious and Charitable Endowments Department of the Government of Tamil Nadu.

Location
This temple is located at the south of the Punnainallur Mariamman Temple, on the Thanjavur-Tiruvarur road, facing east. Punnainallur Kothandaramar Temple is also near to this place.

Presiding deity
The presiding deity is known as Kailasanathar. In front of the sanctum sanctorum balipeetam, nandhi, sculptures of Sambandar, Appar, Sundarar and Manikkavacakar are found. In the left the shrine of goddess Kalyanasundari is found. In the prakara Ganapathi, Ayyappan, Karthikeya with Valli and Deivanai, Gajalakshmi, Anjaneya Navagrahas, Sani, Bhairava, Surya and Chandra and in the kosta of the presiding deity Ganapathi, Dakshinamurti, Lingodbhava, Brahma and Durga are found.

References 

Hindu temples in Thanjavur district